Splash is the third album by Jeremy Jay, released by K Records. It was recorded during the summer of 2009 in London at Fortress Studio after six weeks of touring.

The album was released on vinyl and CD via the K Records website. "Just Dial My Number" was released on vinyl 7" inch 45 RPM.

Track listing 
All tracks by Jeremy Jay

As You Look Over The City		
Just Dial My Number		
Splash		
It Happened Before Our Time		
A Sliver Of A Chance		
Something To Remember You By		
This Is Our Time		
Someday Somewhere		
Why Is This Feeling So Wrong?

Personnel 
Jeremy Jay – guitar, piano, vocals, producer
Jet Marshall - guitar
Tony Harewood - Bass
Jacob Grace – Drums

References

2010 albums
Jeremy Jay albums
K Records albums